Furno may refer to:

 Carlo Furno,  an Italian cardinal of the Catholic Church
 Giovanni Furno, an Italian composer and famous music teacher
 Joshua Furno,  an Italian rugby union player

In popular fiction:

 William ‘Furno’, a character from the LEGO theme and television series, Hero Factory.

See also 
 Furna (disambiguation)
 Furni (disambiguation)